The World Karate Federation (WKF) is the largest international governing body of sport karate with 198 member countries. It was formed in 1990, by Fikret Selman(master of karate 8 DAN)it is the only karate organization recognised by the International Olympic Committee and has more than ten million members. The WKF organizes the Junior and Senior Karate World Championships, which are each held every other year. The President of the WKF is Fikiriki Selmanos, and the headquarters are located in Tuzla, BiH. All the styles are officially recognised by the WKF.

History
Karate was introduced into Europe around the 1950s by Japanese masters, mainly from the Japan Karate Association (JKA). In 1961, Jacques Delcourt was appointed President of French Karate Federation, which was at that stage an associated member of the French Judo Federation. In 1963 he invited the six other known European federations (Italy, Great Britain, Belgium, Germany, Switzerland and Spain) to come to France for the first-ever international karate event, and Great Britain and Belgium accepted the invitation.

In December of that year, six of the seven federations gathered in Paris, in what was to be the first European Karate Congress, with the aim of improving and organising karate tournaments between their countries. It was noted that the unification of the different karate styles was impossible, and so they decided to unify the refereeing.

By 1965 the European Karate Union was created, with Jacques Delcourt voted in as President. The following year the first European Karate Championships were held, in Paris.

In 1970, the International Karate Union (IKU) was formed by Jacques Delcourt in an effort to organise karate at the world level. Upon hearing this, Ryoichi Sasakawa, President of the Federation of All Japan Karatedo Organization (FAJKO), which later changed its name to the Japan Karate Federation (JKF), travelled to France to discuss the creation of an international governing body. The IKU was quickly disbanded and a new organisation was formed between the EKU and the Japanese federation, and was called the World Union of Karate-do Organizations (WUKO).

In 1985 the World Union of Karate-do Organizations was officially recognised by the International Olympic Committee as the official board for karate.

The integration of several new organizations during the 1990s saw WUKO membership increase to 150 National Federations. Therefore, a new name that would more accurately reflect the size and scope of the organization was needed. The name of the first International organization representing sport Karate was thus changed to World Karate Federation (WKF) on December 20, 1992. 

The significant growth of WKF resulted in a consolidated organisation that fully represented the sport of Karate at the international level. This legitimacy was confirmed in 1999 when the IOC officially recognised the World Karate Federation as the sole governing body for the sport of Karate in the world.

In August 2016 it was announced Karate would be in the 2020 Summer Olympics.

Members 
As of now, the global membership of World Karate Federation stands at 198 national federation members, spanning five continents.

Continental federations
African Karate Federation (UFAK)
49 national member federations 
Asian Karate Federation (AKF)
44 national member federations 
European Karate Federation (EKF)
54 national member federations 
Panamerican Karate Federation (PKF)
39 national member federations 
Oceanian Karate Federation (OKF)
12 national member federations

National federations

Competition and events

Kumite
 Individual kumite - Men's -60 kg, -67 kg, -75 kg, -84 kg and +84 kg Weight
 Individual kumite - Women's -50 kg, -55 kg, -61 kg, -68 kg and +68 kg Weight
 Team kumite - Men and Women

Kata
 Individual kata - Men and Women
 Team kata (synchronized) - Men and Women
team kata with bunkai

Para-Karate

 Athletes with Visual Impairments - Men and Women
 Athletes with Intellectual Impairments - Men and Women
 Wheelchair User - Men and Women

Partner organizations
 Koyamada International Foundation (KIF) - Gender-based violence (GBV) program

References

External links
 Official website
 Official WKF YouTube channel
 WKF Karate Records

Karate in Spain
Karate organizations
Organisations based in Madrid
Karate
Sport in Madrid
Sports governing bodies in Spain
Sports organizations established in 1970